Fernando Ledesma may refer to:
Fernando Ledesma (politician) (born 1939), Spanish politician
Fernando Ledesma (footballer) (born 1992), Argentine footballer